Events in the year 1817 in Art.

Events
October 5 – Hokusai paints the "Big Daruma" on paper measuring 18x10.8 m at the Hongan-ji Nagoya Betsuin in Nagoya, Japan.
December 28 – English painter Benjamin Haydon introduces John Keats to William Wordsworth and Charles Lamb at a dinner in London to celebrate progress on his painting Christ's Entry into Jerusalem (in which all feature).
Dulwich Picture Gallery in London, designed by John Soane as Britain's first purpose-built public art gallery, is completed and opened.
Construction of the Vatican Museum begins.

Works

Louis-Marie Autissier – Miniature self-portrait
François Joseph Bosio – Hyacinth Awaiting His Turn
Antonio Canova – The Three Graces (marble sculpture, Woburn Abbey, England)
Francis Chantrey – The Sleeping Children (marble sculpture, Lichfield Cathedral, England)
John Constable
Flatford Mill
Weymouth Bay: Bowleaze Cove and Jordon Hill
John Crome – Boys Bathing on the River Wensum
John James Halls – Rear-Admiral George Cockburn
George Hayter – The Tribute Money
Orest Kiprensky – Young Gardener
Raphaelle Peale - Orange and Book (c.)
Pierre-Paul Prud'hon – Charles Maurice de Talleyrand-Périgord

Births
January 29 – John Callcott Horsley, English painter (died 1903)
February 15 – Charles-François Daubigny, French painter (died 1878)
February 23 – George Frederic Watts, English painter and sculptor (died 1904)
February 28 – Walter Hood Fitch, Scottish-born botanical artist (died 1892)
March 1 – Josephine Calamatta, French painter and engraver (died 1893)
March 7 – Alexandre Antigna, French painter (died 1878)
April 4 – P. C. Skovgaard, Danish romantic nationalist landscape painter (died 1875)
July 1 – John Gilbert, English painter (died 1897)
August 1 – Richard Dadd, English painter and draughtsman (died 1886)
August 4 – Antoine Dominique Magaud, French painter (died 1899)
November 3 – Ernest Hébert, French painter and academician (died 1908)
November 22 – François Bonvin, French realist painter (died 1887)

Deaths
March 27 – Josiah Boydell, publisher and painter (born 1752)
May 10 – Georg Haas, Danish engraver (born 1751)
 June – Claude-Jean-Baptiste Hoin, French portrait and landscape painter (born 1750)
June 4 – Daniël Dupré, Dutch engraver, painter, draftsman, and watercolorist (born 1751)
 September – Thomas Wyon, engraver of medals (born 1792)
September 8 – John Carter,  English draughtsman and architect (born 1748)
October 13 – Julius Caesar Ibbetson, landscape painter (born 1759)
November 5 – Carl Haller von Hallerstein, art historian (born 1774)
November 8 – Andrea Appiani, neoclassical painter (born 1754)
December 20 – Lié Louis Périn-Salbreux, painter, pastellist and miniaturist (born 1753)
December 27 – Pierre-Michel Alix, French engraver (born 1762)
 date unknown
 Jean Népomucène Hermann Nast, porcelain manufacturer (born 1754)
 Joaquín Bernardo Rubert, Spanish still life floral painter (born 1772)

References

 
Years of the 19th century in art
1810s in art